Use Your Illusion can refer to several works by American hard rock band Guns N' Roses:
Use Your Illusion I, a 1991 album 
Use Your Illusion II, a 1991 album 
 Use Your Illusion Tour, a tour to support the release of the above albums
Use Your Illusion, a 1998 compilation album
Use Your Illusion World Tour - 1992 in Tokyo I, a 1992 live video
Use Your Illusion World Tour - 1992 in Tokyo II, a 1992 live video